The 1900 Connecticut gubernatorial election was held on November 6, 1900. Republican nominee George P. McLean defeated Democratic nominee S. L. Bronson with 53.02% of the vote.

General election

Candidates
Major party candidates
George P. McLean, Republican
S. L. Bronson, Democratic

Other candidates
Charles E. Steele, Prohibition
George A. Sweetland, Social Democratic 
Adam Marx, Socialist Labor

Results

References

1900
Connecticut
Gubernatorial